New West Records is a record label based in Nashville, Tennessee, and Athens, Georgia. It had offices in Burbank, California, and Beverly Hills, California. The label was established in 1998 by Cameron Strang "for artists who perform real music for real people" and has been home to indie rock, alternative country, and Americana bands. The label's records in the US were previously distributed by Alternative Distribution Alliance beginning in 2013 through to 2018 when Redeye Distribution assumed distribution in 2018. The PIAS Group handles the distribution in Europe.

Overview 
New West has had numerous albums debut in the Billboard Top 200 and has a number of Grammy Award-winning artists and releases, including Dwight Yoakam, Steve Earle, Rickie Lee Jones, Kris Kristofferson and Delbert McClinton. The current label roster features All Them Witches, Ben Folds, Sara Watkins, Shovels & Rope, The Devil Makes Three, Buddy Miller, Corb Lund, Luther Dickinson, Nikki Lane, Rodney Crowell, Lily & Madeleine, Robert Ellis, Caroline Rose and more. The catalogue includes releases from Benji Hughes, Drive-By Truckers, Jason Isbell, and Vic Chesnutt.

In 2007 and 2008 New West was recognized by NARM as the entertainment software supplier of the year. New West Records also exclusively releases CDs and DVDs from the award-winning television program Austin City Limits.

See also
List of New West Records artists

References

External links

 Official site

Record labels established in 1998
American independent record labels
Indie rock record labels
Alternative rock record labels
Austin City Limits